Harttiella is a genus of armored catfishes native to South America.

Species
There are currently seven recognized species in this genus:
 Harttiella crassicauda (Boeseman, 1953)
 Harttiella intermedia Covain & Fisch-Muller, 2012
 Harttiella janmoli Covain & Fisch-Muller, 2012
 Harttiella longicauda Covain & Fisch-Muller, 2012
 Harttiella lucifer Covain & Fisch-Muller, 2012
 Harttiella parva Covain & Fisch-Muller, 2012
 Harttiella pilosa Covain & Fisch-Muller, 2012

References

Harttiini
Catfish of South America
Catfish genera
Freshwater fish genera